In mathematics, the flatness (symbol: ⏥) of a surface is the degree to which it approximates a mathematical plane. The term is often generalized for higher-dimensional manifolds to describe the degree to which they approximate the Euclidean space of the same dimensionality. (See curvature.)

Flatness in homological algebra and algebraic geometry means, of an object  in an abelian category, that  is an exact functor.  See flat module or, for more generality, flat morphism.

Character encodings

See also
Developable surface
Flat (mathematics)

References

Geometry